L-attributed grammars are a special type of attribute grammars. They allow the attributes to be evaluated in one depth-first left-to-right traversal of the abstract syntax tree. As a result, attribute evaluation in L-attributed grammars can be incorporated conveniently in top-down parsing. 

 the attributes of the symbols 

Every S-attributed syntax-directed definition is also L-attributed.

Implementing L-attributed definitions in Bottom-Up parsers requires rewriting L-attributed definitions into translation schemes.

Many programming languages are L-attributed. Special types of compilers, the narrow compilers, are based on some form of L-attributed grammar. These are a strict superset of S-attributed grammars. Used for code synthesis.

Either "inherited attributes" or "synthesized attributes" associated with the occurrence of symbol .

References 

Formal languages
Compiler construction